Aegidomorpha psammodina is a moth in the family Copromorphidae, and the only species in the genus Aegidomorpha. It is found in China.

References

External links 
Natural History Museum Lepidoptera generic names catalog

Copromorphidae
Moths described in 1932